Moto E or variation may refer to:

Motorcycling
 MotoE World Championship, FIM electric prototype superbike motorcycle racing championship
 FIM eRoad Racing World Cup, electric superbike motorcycle championship in 2013
 FIM Moto E European Championship, electric sportbike motorcycle championship
 FIM MotoE class of competition motorcycle, used in the various FIM Moto e series
 Energica Ego, the Ego electric motorcycle family from the Energica Motor Company used for the various FIM MotoE series

Motorola
Moto E is the name of a series of Android smartphone developed by Motorola Mobility, including:

 Motorola Moto E series of mobile phones
 Moto E (1st generation) 2014
 Moto E (2nd generation) 2015
 Moto E3 (3rd generation) 2016
 Moto E4 (4th generation) 2017
 Moto E5 (5th generation) 2018
 Moto E6 (6th generation) 2019
 Moto E7 (7th generation) 2020
 Moto E (2020)

See also

 Motorola Moto, a brand of Motorola Mobility including a wider range of products
 MotoGP, family of motorcycle racing grand prix
 Emoto
 
 
 Moto (disambiguation)
 E (disambiguation)